Lodhipur is a village in Shaheed Bhagat Singh Nagar district of Punjab State, India. The village is administrated by Sarpanch an elected representative of the village.

Demography 
As of 2011, Lodhipur has a total number of 261 houses and population of 1193 of which 590 include are males while 603 are females according to the report published by Census India in 2011. The literacy rate of Lodhipur is 74.10%, lower than the state average of 75.84%. The population of children under the age of 6 years is 135 which is 11.32% of total population of Lodhipur, and child sex ratio is approximately 824 as compared to Punjab state average of 846.

Most of the people are from Schedule Caste which constitutes 70.75% of total population in Lodhipur. The town does not have any Schedule Tribe population so far.

As per the report published by Census India in 2011, 354 people were engaged in work activities out of the total population of Lodhipur which includes 340 males and 14 females. According to census survey report 2011, 99.44% workers describe their work as main work and 0.56% workers are involved in Marginal activity providing livelihood for less than 6 months.

Education 
The village has a Punjabi medium, co-ed primary school founded in 1959. The schools provide mid-day meal as per Indian Midday Meal Scheme. As per Right of Children to Free and Compulsory Education Act the school provide free education to children between the ages of 6 and 14.

KC Engineering College and Doaba Khalsa Trust Group Of Institutions are the nearest colleges.

Transport 

See also 
List of villages in India

References

External links 
 Tourism of Punjab
 Census of Punjab
 Locality Based PINCode

Villages in Shaheed Bhagat Singh Nagar district